Forcipomyia bipunctata is a species of biting midges (flies in the family Ceratopogonidae) from Europe and North America.

References

Further reading

 
 

Ceratopogonidae
Diptera of Europe
Diptera of North America
Insects described in 1767
Taxa named by Carl Linnaeus
Articles created by Qbugbot